Haldummulla Fort ( Haldummulla Pærani Balakotuwa), was a fort built by the Portuguese in Haldummulla, Badulla. The 17th century fort was completely destroyed except the foundations, which can still be seen today in the forestry hill area. It served as a frontier post and staging post for Colombo. It provided a good view coverage of the surrounding areas.

References

See also
Forts in Sri Lanka
Kotugodella fort

Buildings and structures in Badulla District
Forts in Uva Province
Portuguese forts in Sri Lanka